The women's national volleyball team of Thailand represents the Thailand in international volleyball competitions. It is managed by the Thailand Volleyball Association.

The team won a silver medal in the 2016 Montreux Masters, the best finish by any team outside the Americas, East Asia and Europe. Also, the team took a fourth-place finish in 2012 World Grand Prix. And the team took a bronze medal in Summer Universiade in two times, the best finish by any team outside the world.

In Asia, the team won a bronze medal in the Asian Games 2014. Also, the team won a gold medal in the Asian Championship in two times. And, the team won a gold medal in the Asian Cup Championship. The country has also participated in four World Championships, one World Cup, fourteen World Grand Prixs and two World Grand Champions Cup.

History
Volleyball had spread into Thailand since before 1900s. In the past, volleyball was a popular sport among the Chinese and Vietnamese. Until there was competition between the clubs and community associations, sometimes contacted to compete in the Northern region, Northeastern region and The Gold Cup volleyball tournament in the Southern Region.

Since 1934 the Ministry of Education published rules of volleyball by Noppakun Pongsuwan. He was an expert person on sports, especially volleyball. He invited a lecture on how to play, the rules of volleyball to physical education teachers. After that, Department of Physical Education
had provide an annual girls' volleyball tournament. For the first time, Department of Physical Education had set course of the central physical education school for girls' student to studied Volleyball and Netball.

In 1957, Nawa Akat Ek Luang Supachalasai, Director of the Department of Physical Education had been established the "Amateur Volleyball Association of Thailand", with the aim to supported and publicized the progress volleyball and managed a 6 players volleyball tournament and the annual volleyball competition in other government office, such as the Department of Physical Education, University Sports Committee, Bangkok Municipality, Military Sports Council, as well as the Thailand National Games volleyball tournament in women's and men's volleyball.

Current squad
The following is the 2022 FIVB Volleyball Women's World Championship
Head coach:  Danai Sriwatcharamethakul

2023 Results and fixtures

Intercontinental tournaments
FIVB Women's Nations League

Dates: 30 May – 16 July
FIVB rankings points: 40 points

FIVB Women's Olympic Qualification Tournaments

Dates: 16–24 September 
Host Country: 
FIVB rankings points: 35 points

Continental tournaments

Asian Women's Volleyball Championship
Dates: 3–10 September 
Host country:  Nakhon Ratchasima, Thailand 
FIVB rankings points: 35 points

Volleyball at the Asian Games
Dates: 29 September – 7 October
Host country:  Hangzhou, China

Volleyball at the Southeast Asian Games
Dates: 9–14 May
Host country:  Phnom Penh, Cambodia

Head coach 
  Kiattipong Radchatagriengkai (1998–2016)
  Nataphon Srisamutnak (2002–2005)
  Kittikun Sriutthawong (2021)
  Danai Sriwatcharamethakul (2016–present)

Former players 

 Amporn Hyapha
 Anna Paijinda
 Bhudsabun Prasaengkaew
 Bouard Lithawat 
 Chitaporn Kamlangmak
 Em-orn Phanusit
 Gullapa Piampongsan
 Jutarat Montripila
 Kamonporn Sukmak
 Karina Krause
 Laddawan Srisakorn
 Likhit Namsen 
 Malika Kanthong
 Malinee Kongtan
 Nantakan Petchplay
 Narumon Khanan
 Nootsara Tomkom
 Nurak Nokputta
 Onuma Sittirak
 Parinya Pankaew
 Patcharee Sangmuang
 Piyamas Koijapo 
 Pleumjit Thinkaow
 Prim Intawong
 Rasamee Supamool
 Rattanaporn Sanuanram
 Saranya Srisakorn
 Saymai Paladsrichuay
 Sineenat Phocharoen
 Sommai Niyompon
 Sontaya Keawbundit 
 Soraya Phomla
 Suphap Phongthong
 Tapaphaipun Chaisri
 Tikamporn Changkeaw
 Utaiwan Kaensing
 Wanitchaya Luangtonglang
 Wanlapa Jid-ong
 Wanna Buakaew
 Warapan Thinprabat
 Wilavan Apinyapong
 Wisuta Heebkaew

Competition history

World Championship
 1998 — 13th place
 2002 — 17th place
 2010 — 13th place
 2014 — 17th place
 2018 — 13th place
 2022 — 13th place

World Cup
 2007 — 10th place

World Grand Champions Cup
 2009 — 6th place
 2013 — 5th place

World Grand Prix
 2002 — 8th place 
 2003 — 10th place
 2004 — 10th place
 2005 — 12th place
 2006 — 11th place 
 2008 — 11th place 
 2009 — 8th place
 2010 — 10th place 
 2011 — 6th place
 2012 — 4th place
 2013 — 13th place
 2014 — 11th place
 2015 — 9th place
 2016 — 6th place 
 2017 — 10th place

Nations League
 2018 — 15th place
 2019 — 12th place
 2020 —  Cancelled due to COVID-19 pandemic.
 2021 — 16th place
 2022 — 8th place

Montreux Masters
 2016 —  Silver Medal
 2017 — 7th place
 2019 — 4th place

Asian Games
 1966 — 5th place
 1970 — 5th place
 1978 — 5th place
 1986 — 4th place
 1990 — 6th place
 1994 — 5th place
 1998 — 4th place
 2002 — 5th place
 2006 — 4th place
 2010 — 5th place
 2014 —  Bronze Medal
 2018 —  Silver Medal
 2022 —

Asian Championship
 1987 — 5th place
 1989 — 6th place
 1991 — 7th place
 1993 — 7th place
 1995 — 5th place
 1997 — 5th place
 1999 — 4th place
 2001 —  Bronze Medal 
 2003 — 4th place
 2005 — 6th place
 2007 —  Bronze Medal
 2009 —  Gold Medal
 2011 — 4th place
 2013 —  Gold Medal
 2015 —  Bronze Medal
 2017 —  Silver Medal
 2019 —  Silver Medal
 2021 —  Cancelled 
 2023 —

Asian Cup
 2008 —  Bronze Medal
 2010 —  Silver Medal
 2012 —  Gold Medal
 2014 — 5th place
 2016 —  Bronze Medal
 2018 —  Bronze Medal
 2020 —  Cancelled due to COVID-19 pandemic.
 2022 —  Bronze Medal

Southeast Asian Games
 1977 —  Bronze Medal
 1979 —
 1981 —
 1983 — 4th place
 1985 —  Silver Medal
 1987 —  Bronze Medal
 1989 —  Gold Medal 
 1991 —  Gold Medal 
 1993 —  Silver Medal
 1995 —  Gold Medal 
 1997 —  Gold Medal
 2001 —  Gold Medal 
 2003 —  Gold Medal
 2005 —  Gold Medal 
 2007 —  Gold Medal 
 2009 —  Gold Medal 
 2011 —  Gold Medal 
 2013 —  Gold Medal
 2015 —  Gold Medal 
 2017 —  Gold Medal
 2019 —  Gold Medal
 2021 —  Gold Medal

ASEAN Grand Prix
  2019 — (Leg 1)  Gold Medal   (Leg 2)  Gold Medal
 2022 —   Gold Medal

See also
 Thailand men's national volleyball team

References

External links
Official website
FIVB profile

National women's volleyball teams
W
Women's volleyball in Thailand